Laldampuia (born 3 June 1992) is an Indian professional footballer who plays as a midfielder for Aizawl in the I-League.

Career
Born in Mizoram, Laldampuia was a part of the Aizawl side that won promotion to the I-League in 2015. He scored a brace against Chanmari in the I-League 2nd Division in the match that secured promotion for Aizawl. Overall, Laldampuia scored five goals during the 2nd Division campaign and earned a new contract with Aizawl.

On 13 February 2016, Laldampuia made his professional debut for Aizawl against Shillong Lajong in the I-League. He came on as a 70th-minute substitute as Aizawl drew the match 0–0.

He now plays as a midfielder for Gokulam Kerala FC in the I-League.

Career statistics

References

External links 
 Aizawl Football Club Profile.

1992 births
Living people
Indian footballers
Aizawl FC players
Association football midfielders
Footballers from Mizoram
Mizoram Premier League players
I-League 2nd Division players
I-League players